Puerto Rico Highway 182 (PR-182) is a primary road located entirely within the municipality of Yabucoa, Puerto Rico. The road has its northern terminus at its intersection with  Puerto Rico Highway 181 in the northwestern end of the town, near San Lorenzo, and its southern terminus in downtown Yabucoa, near PR-9910 and PR-3, where it provides access to many municipal government offices. PR-182 provides an alternate route to PR-181 to reach San Lorenzo from Yabucoa. The latter road continues south-southwest to Patillas.

Taking PR-181 and PR-182 from San Lorenzo to Yabucoa can take significantly longer than taking PR-203 to PR-30 in Gurabo, continuing PR-30 east to Humacao and then taking PR-53 to Yabucoa, because the PR-203/PR-30/PR-53 (with the exception of a junction in PR-203 with PR-931) is mostly freeway.

Major intersections

See also

 List of highways numbered 182

References

External links
 

182
Yabucoa, Puerto Rico